Friedrich Lübbert (26 March 1818 — 15 January 1882) was a German composer, military kapellmeister and oboist. He is most known as the composer of the Helenenmarsch, a popular piece for military bands written in honour of countess Helene von Hülsen. The march won the first prize in a 1857 competition sponsored by music publisher Bote & Bock.

He was kapellmeister for 27 years until his final retirement in 1881.

References 

Paul E. Bierley, William H. Rehrig: The heritage encyclopedia of band music: composers and their music. Integrity Press, Westerville, Ohio 1991, .

Paul Frank (Begründer), Wilhelm Altmann (Bearbeiter): Kurzgefaßtes Tonkünstler-Lexikon. 14. Auflage, Heinrichshofen, Wilhelmshaven 1936, S. 365, .

Georg Kandler: Deutsche Armeemärsche. Ein Beitrag zur Geschichte des Instrumentariums, des Repertoires, der Funktion, des Personals und des Widerhalls der deutschen Militärmusik. Howacht, Bad Godesberg 1962.

Joachim Toeche-Mittler: Armeemärsche, 1. Teil – Eine historische Plauderei zwischen Regimentsmusiken und Trompeterkorps rund um die deutsche Marschmusik. 3. Auflage. Speemann, Stuttgart 1980, .

Joachim Toeche-Mittler: Armeemärsche, 2. Teil – Sammlung und Dokumentation. 2. Auflage. Speemann, Stuttgart 1977, .

Joachim Toeche-Mittler: Armeemärsche, 3. Teil – die Geschichte unserer Marschmusik. Speemann, Stuttgart 1975, .

19th-century German composers
German oboists
1818 births
1882 deaths